
Gmina Wiśniewo is a rural gmina (administrative district) in Mława County, Masovian Voivodeship, in east-central Poland. Its seat is the village of Wiśniewo, which lies approximately 6 kilometres (3 mi) south-west of Mława and 103 km (64 mi) north-west of Warsaw.

Villages
Gmina Wiśniewo contains the villages and settlements of Bogurzyn, Bogurzynek, Głużek, Korboniec, Kosiny Bartosowe, Kosiny Kapiczne, Kowalewo, Modła, Nowa Otocznia, Podkrajewo, Stara Otocznia, Stare Kosiny, Wiśniewko, Wiśniewo, Wojnówka and Żurominek.

Neighbouring gminas
Gmina Wiśniewo is bordered by the town of Mława and by the gminas of Lipowiec Kościelny, Strzegowo, Stupsk, Szreńsk and Szydłowo.

References

Polish official population figures 2006

Wisniewo
Mława County